Mission Sunlight is a 1998 educational adventure game developed by Media Factory and published by index+.

Critical reception 
Adventure Archiv negatively compared it to the 2000 adventure game Monet: The Mystery of the Orangery due to the latter having NPC characters to aid the narrative. Metzomagic said the game successfully reached its target market of primary school age children.

References 

1998 video games